Oursler is a surname. Notable people with the surname include:

Fulton Oursler (1893–1952), American journalist, playwright, editor, and writer
Stephanie Oursler, American visual artist and political activist
Tony Oursler (born 1957), American artist (grandson of Fulton)
Will Oursler (1913–1985), American writer (son of Fulton)

See also
Oursler, Kansas, ghost town, named after W.E.M. Oursler